Väike-Pakri Airfield was an airfield on Väike-Pakri Island, Harju County, Estonia.

The airfield was used by Soviet Air Force.

References

Airports in Estonia
Buildings and structures in Harju County
Soviet Air Force bases